The yellow-billed blue magpie or gold-billed magpie (Urocissa flavirostris) is a passerine bird in the crow and jay family, Corvidae. It forms a superspecies with the Taiwan blue magpie and the red-billed blue magpie. The species ranges across the northern parts of the Indian Subcontinent including the lower Himalayas, with a disjunct population in Vietnam.

Description
Sexes alike. Head, neck, and breast black, with a white patch on the nape; remainder of lower plumage white, faintly tinged with lilac; whole upper plumage purplish-blue, brighter on the wings and tail; flight-feathers tipped with white, the outermost edged with the same; tail long and graduated, the feathers blue, broadly tipped with white, all except the very long central pair having a band of black in front of the white

Distribution
The yellow-billed blue magpie is found throughout the Himalayas from Hazara to the Brahmaputra. It is divided into two races. A resident species, but during the winter months it usually deserts the higher parts of its summer zone. 
From Simla eastwards, the closely allied red-billed blue magpie (Urocissa erythroryncha) is often found in the same areas as the yellow-billed species; it is particularly common about Mussoorie, Tehri-Garhwal, -Kumaon, and in Nepal, and may be easily distinguished by its red beak and the greater extent of the white nape-patch. This bird is also mainly found in the upper parts of Kashmir in the summer season.

Behaviour
The blue magpies are, as may be judged from their handsome tails, essentially arboreal birds; though, while they are most usually to be met with in heavy jungle areas, they also venture out into the trees amongst cultivation, and at times on to bare mountain sides at high elevations. They frequently feed on the ground and then adopt a curious hopping gait, with the tail held high to prevent it coming into contact with the ground. They live in parties of seven or eight birds and are very partial to particular localities, so that once a party has taken up its abode in any particular nullah or patch of forest it will generally be found there. They are very active, flying incessantly from bough to bough and not hesitating to launch high into the air when flying from ridge to ridge; a party of these bird crossing a nullah out of gunshot above one's head is a curious sight, with their long tails waving in the air and the light shining through the feathers. The flight is rather slow, laboured, and undulating once the bird comes into the open. The food consists of small mammals, the eggs and young of other birds, insects, and wild fruits and berries of various kinds. This bird is very noisy; the ordinary call is harsh and grating, but it has a wide variety of notes, some of which are melodious enough.

Nesting
The nest is built in a fork of a tree, usually of moderate size but with dense foliage, and is difficult to find. It is a rather large and roughly constructed cup of sticks with a lining of fine grass, roots and fibres. The clutch consists of three or four eggs. The base-colour varies from a pale, dingy yellowish-stone colour to a darkish rather reddish-stone colour, and there is very occasionally a faint greenish tinge. The markings consist of small specks, blotches, streaks, and mottlings of various shades of brown, sienna 1 or purple, and they generally tend to collect in a cap or zone about the broad end of the egg.

References

yellow-billed blue magpie
Birds of the Himalayas
Birds of Eastern Himalaya
Birds of Vietnam
yellow-billed blue magpie
yellow-billed blue magpie